Gastornis is an extinct genus of large flightless birds that lived during the mid Paleocene to mid Eocene epochs of the Paleogene period. Fossils have been found in Europe, Asia and North America, with the remains from North America originally assigned to the genus Diatryma.

Gastornis species were very large birds, and have traditionally been considered to be predators of small mammals. However, several lines of evidence, including the lack of hooked claws in known Gastornis footprints and studies of their beak structure and isotopic signatures of their bones have caused scientists to reinterpret these birds as herbivores that probably fed on tough plant material and seeds. Gastornis is generally agreed to be related to Galloanserae, the group containing waterfowl and gamebirds.

History

Gastornis was first described in 1855 from a fragmentary skeleton. It was named after Gaston Planté, described as a "studious young man full of zeal", who had discovered the first fossils in clay formation deposits at Meudon near Paris. The discovery was notable due to the large size of the specimens, and because, at the time, Gastornis represented one of the oldest known birds. Additional bones of the first known species, G. parisiensis, were found in the mid 1860s. Somewhat more complete specimens, this time referred to the new species G. eduardsii (now considered a synonym of G. parisiensis) were found a decade later. The specimens found in the 1870s formed the basis for a widely circulated and reproduced skeletal restoration by Lemoine. The skulls of these original Gastornis fossils were unknown except for nondescript fragments, and several bones used in Lemoine's illustration turned out to be those of other animals. Thus, the European bird was long reconstructed as a sort of gigantic crane-like bird.

In 1874, the American paleontologist Edward Drinker Cope discovered another fragmentary set of fossils in the Wasatch Formation of New Mexico. He considered them to belong to a distinct genus and species of giant ground bird, which, in 1876, he named Diatryma gigantea, from Ancient Greek διάτρημα, diatrema, meaning “through a hole”, referring to the large foramina (perforations) that penetrate some of the foot bones. A single gastornithid toe bone from New Jersey was described by Othniel Charles Marsh in 1894 and classified as the new genus and species Barornis regens, but in 1911 it was recognized that this, too, could be considered a junior synonym of Diatryma (and therefore later Gastornis). Additional fragmentary specimens were found in Wyoming in 1911 and assigned in 1913 to the new species Diatryma ajax (also now considered a synonym of G. gigantea). In 1916, an American Museum of Natural History expedition to the Bighorn Basin (Willwood Formation) of Wyoming found the first nearly complete skull and skeleton, which was described in 1917 and gave scientists their first clear picture of the bird. Matthew, Granger, and Stein (1917) classified this nearly complete specimen as yet another new species, Diatryma steini.

After the description of Diatryma, most new European specimens were referred to this genus instead of Gastornis. However, after the initial discovery of Diatryma, it soon became clear that it and Gastornis were so similar that the former could be considered a junior synonym of the latter. In fact, this similarity was recognized as early as 1884 by Elliott Coues, but this was debated by researchers throughout the 20th century. Meaningful comparisons between Gastornis and Diatryma were made more difficult by Lemoine's incorrect skeletal illustration, the composite nature of which was not discovered until the early 1980s. Following this, several authors began to recognize a greater degree of similarity between the European and North American birds, often placing both in the same order (Gastornithiformes) or even family (Gastornithidae). This newly recognized degree of similarity caused many scientists to tentatively accept their synonymy, pending a comprehensive review of the anatomy of these birds. Consequently, the correct scientific name of the genus is Gastornis.

Description
 
Gastornis is known from a large amount of fossil remains, but the clearest picture of the bird comes from a few nearly complete specimens of the species G. gigantea. These were generally very large birds, with huge beaks and massive skulls superficially similar to the carnivorous South American "terror birds" (phorusrhacids).

The skull of G. gigantea was huge compared to the body and powerfully built. The beak was extremely tall and compressed (flattened from side to side). Unlike other species of Gastornis, G. gigantea lacked characteristic grooves and pits on the underlying bone. The 'lip' of the beak was straight, without a raptorial hook as found in the predatory phorusrhacids. The nostrils were small and positioned close to the front of the eyes about midway up the skull. The vertebrae were short and massive, even in the neck. The neck was relatively short, consisting of at least 13 massive vertebrae. The torso was relatively short. The wings were vestigial, with the upper wing-bones small and highly reduced, similar in proportion to the wings of the cassowary.

Classification
Gastornis and its close relatives are classified together in the family Gastornithidae, and were long considered to be members of the order Gruiformes. However, the traditional concept of Gruiformes has since been shown to be an unnatural grouping. Beginning in the late 1980s with the first phylogenetic analysis of gastornithid relationships, consensus began to grow that they were close relatives of the lineage that includes waterfowl and screamers, the Anseriformes. A 2007 study showed that gastornithids were a very early-branching group of anseriformes, and formed the sister group to all other members of that lineage.

Recognizing the apparent close relationship between gastornithids and waterfowl, some researchers classify gastornithids within the anseriform group itself. Others restrict the name Anseriformes only to the crown group formed by all modern species, and label the larger group including extinct relatives of anseriformes, like the gastornithids, with the name Anserimorphae. Gastornithids are therefore sometimes placed in their own order, Gastornithiformes.

A simplified version of the family tree found by Agnolin et al. in 2007 is reproduced below.

Today, at least five species of Gastornis are generally accepted as valid. The type species, Gastornis parisiensis, was named and described by Hébert in two 1855 papers. It is known from fossils found in western and central Europe, dating from the late Paleocene to the early Eocene. Other species previously considered distinct, but which are now considered synonymous with G. parisiensis, include G. edwardsii (Lemoine, 1878) and G. klaasseni (Newton, 1885). Additional European species of Gastornis are G. russeli (Martin, 1992) from the late Paleocene of Berru, France, and G. sarasini (Schaub, 1929) from the early-middle Eocene. G. geiselensis, from the middle Eocene of Messel, Germany, has been considered a synonym of G. sarasini, however, other researchers have stated that there is currently insufficient evidence to synonymize the two, and that they should be kept separate at least pending a more detailed comparison of all gastornithids. The supposed small species G. minor is considered to be a nomen dubium.

Gastornis gigantea (Cope, 1876), formerly Diatryma, dates from the middle Eocene of western North America. Its junior synonyms include Barornis regens (Marsh, 1894) and Omorhamphus storchii (Sinclair, 1928). O. storchii was described based on fossils from lower Eocene rocks of Wyoming. The species was named in honor of T. C. von Storch, who found the fossils remains in Princeton 1927 Expedition. The fossil bones originally described as Omorhamphus storchii are now considered to be the remains of a juvenile Gastornis gigantea. Specimen YPM PU 13258 from lower Eocene Willwood Formation rocks of Park County, Wyoming also seems to be a juvenile – perhaps also of G. gigantea, in which case it would be an even younger individual.

Gastornis xichuanensis, from the early Eocene of Henan, China, is known only from a tibiotarsus (upper foot bone). It was originally described in 1980 as the only species in the distinct genus Zhongyuanus. However, a re-evaluation of the fossil published in 2013 concluded that the differences between this specimen and the same bone in Gastornis species were minor, and that it should be considered an asian species of Gastornis.

Paleobiology

Diet

A long-standing debate surrounding Gastornis is the interpretation of its diet. It has often been depicted as a predator of contemporary small mammals, which famously included the early horse Eohippus. However, with the size of Gastornis legs, the bird would have had to have been more agile to catch fast-moving prey than the fossils suggest it to have been. Consequently, Gastornis has been suspected to have been an ambush hunter and/or used pack hunting techniques to pursue or ambush prey; if Gastornis was a predator, it would have certainly needed some other means of hunting prey through the dense forest. Alternatively, it could have used its strong beak for eating large or strong vegetation.

The skull of Gastornis is massive in comparison to those of living ratites of similar body size. Biomechanical analysis of the skull suggests that the jaw-closing musculature was enormous. The lower jaw is very deep, resulting in a lengthened moment arm of the jaw muscles. Both features strongly suggest that Gastornis could generate a powerful bite. Some scientists have proposed that the skull of Gastornis was ‘overbuilt’ for a herbivorous diet and support the traditional interpretation of Gastornis as a carnivore that used its powerfully constructed beak to subdue struggling prey and crack open bones to extract marrow. Others have noted the apparent lack of predatory features in the skull, such as a prominently hooked beak, as evidence that Gastornis was a specialized herbivore (or even an omnivore) of some sort, perhaps having used its large beak to crack hard foods like nuts and seeds. Footprints attributed to gastornithids (possibly a species of Gastornis itself), described in 2012, showed that these birds lacked strongly hooked talons on the hind legs, another line of evidence suggesting that they did not have a predatory lifestyle.

Recent evidence suggests that Gastornis was likely a true herbivore. Studies of the calcium isotopes in the bones of specimens of Gastornis by Thomas Tutken and colleagues showed no evidence that it had meat in its diet. The geochemical analysis further revealed that its dietary habits were similar to those of both herbivorous dinosaurs and mammals when it was compared to known fossil carnivores, such as Tyrannosaurus rex, leaving phorusrhacids as the only major carnivorous flightless birds.

Eggs
In Late Paleocene deposits of Spain and early Eocene deposits of France, shell fragments of huge eggs have turned up, namely in Provence. These were described as the ootaxon Ornitholithus and are presumably from Gastornis. While no direct association exists between Ornitholithus and Gastornis fossils, no other birds of sufficient size are known from that time and place; while the large Diogenornis and Eremopezus are known from the Eocene, the former lived in South America (still separated from North America by the Tethys Ocean then) and the latter is only known from the Late Eocene of North Africa, which also was separated by an (albeit less wide) stretch of the Tethys Ocean from Europe.

Some of these fragments were complete enough to reconstruct a size of 24 by 10 cm (about 9.5 by 4 inches) with shells 2.3–2.5 mm (0.09–0.1 in) thick, roughly half again as large as an ostrich egg and very different in shape from the more rounded ratite eggs. If Remiornis is indeed correctly identified as a ratite (which is quite doubtful, however), Gastornis remains as the only known animal that could have laid these eggs. At least one species of Remiornis is known to have been smaller than Gastornis, and was initially described as Gastornis minor by Mlíkovský in 2002. This would nicely match the remains of eggs a bit smaller than those of the living ostrich, which have also been found in Paleogene deposits of Provence, were it not for the fact that these eggshell fossils also date from the Eocene, but no Remiornis bones are yet known from that time.

Footprints

Several sets of fossil footprints are suspected to belong to Gastornis. One set of footprints was reported from late Eocene gypsum at Montmorency and other locations of the Paris Basin in the 19th century, from 1859 onwards. Described initially by Jules Desnoyers, and later on by Alphonse Milne-Edwards, these trace fossils were celebrated among French geologists of the late 19th century. They were discussed by Charles Lyell in his Elements of Geology as an example of the incompleteness of the fossil record – no bones had been found associated with the footprints. Unfortunately, these fine specimens, which sometimes even preserved details of the skin structure, are now lost. They were brought to the Muséum national d'histoire naturelle when Desnoyers started to work there, and the last documented record of them deals with their presence in the geology exhibition of the MNHN in 1912. The largest of these footprints, although only consisting of a single toe's impression, was 40 cm (16 in) long. The large footprints from the Paris Basin could also be divided into huge and merely large examples, much like the eggshells from southern France, which are 20 million years older.

Another footprint record consists of a single imprint that still exists, though it has proven to be even more controversial. It was found in late Eocene Puget Group rocks in the Green River valley near Black Diamond, Washington. After its discovery, it raised considerable interest in the Seattle area in May–July 1992, being subject of at least two longer articles in the Seattle Times. Variously declared a hoax or genuine, this apparent impression of a single bird foot measures about 27 cm wide by 32 cm long (11 by 13 in) and lacks a hallux (hind toe); it was described as the ichnotaxon Ornithoformipes controversus. Fourteen years after the initial discovery, the debate about the find's authenticity was still unresolved. The specimen is now at Western Washington University.The problem with these early trace fossils is that no fossil of Gastornis has been found to be younger than about 45 million years. The enigmatic "Diatryma" cotei is known from remains almost as old as the Paris basin footprints (whose date never could be accurately determined), but in North America the fossil record of unequivocal gastornithids seems to end even earlier than in Europe. However, in 2009, a landslide near Bellingham, Washington exposed at least 18 tracks on 15 blocks in the Eocene Chuckanut Formation. The anatomy and age (about 53.7 Ma old) of the tracks suggest that the track maker was Gastornis. Although these birds have long been considered to be predators or scavengers, the absence of raptor-like claws supports earlier suggestions that they were herbivores. The Chuckanut tracks are named as the ichnotaxon Rivavipes giantess, inferred to belong to the extinct family Gastornithidae. At least 10 of the tracks are on display at Western Washington University.

Feathers

The plumage of Gastornis has generally been depicted in art as a hair-like covering similar to some ratites. This has been based in part on some fibrous strands recovered from a Green River Formation deposit at Roan Creek, Colorado, which were initially believed to represent Gastornis feathers and named Diatryma filifera. Subsequent examination has shown the supposed feathers were actually not feathers at all, but plant fibers.

However, a second possible Gastornis feather has since been identified, also from the Green River Formation. Unlike the filamentous plant material, this single isolated feather resembles the body feathers of flighted birds, being broad and vaned.

Distribution

Gastornis fossils are known from across western Europe, the western United States, and central China. The earliest (Paleocene) fossils all come from Europe, and it is likely that the genus originated there. Europe in this epoch was an island continent, and Gastornis was the largest terrestrial tetrapod of the landmass. This offers parallels with the malagasy elephant birds, herbivorous birds that were similarly the largest land animals in the isolated landmass of Madagascar, in spite of otherwise mammalian megafauna.

All other fossil remains are from the Eocene; however, it is not currently known how Gastornis dispersed out of Europe and into North America and Asia. Given the presence of Gastornis fossils in the early Eocene of western China, these birds may have spread east from Europe and crossed into North America via the Bering land bridge. Gastornis also may have spread both east and west, arriving separately in eastern Asia and in North America across the Turgai Strait. Direct landbridges with North America are also known.

European Gastornis survived somewhat longer than their North American and Asian counterparts. This seems to coincide with a period of increased isolation of the continent.

Extinction
The reason for the extinction of Gastornis is currently unclear. Competition with mammals has often been cited as a possible factor, but Gastornis did occur in faunas dominated by mammals, and did co-exist with several megafaunal forms like pantodonts. Likewise, extreme climatic events like the Paleocene–Eocene Thermal Maximum (PETM) appear to have had little impact.

Nonetheless, the extended survival in Europe is thought to coincide with increased isolation of the landmass.

References

External links

Gastornithiformes
Paleogene birds of Europe
Paleogene birds of North America
Fossil taxa described in 1855
Paleocene birds
Eocene birds
Paleocene first appearances
Eocene genus extinctions